Andrea Marzi is a German-American virologist. She is chief of the immunobiology and molecular virology unit at the Rocky Mountain Laboratories. Marzi investigates the pathogenesis of filoviruses and vaccine development.

Education 
In 2007, Marzi received a Ph.D. in virology from the University of Erlangen–Nuremberg where she studied the glycoprotein-mediated entry of Ebola virus (EBOV) and HIV. Her dissertation was titled The role of cellular attachment factors for filovirus infection. Later that year, Marzi moved to Winnipeg to join Heinz Feldmann’s group at the National Microbiology Laboratory to work in the Biological Safety Level 4 (BSL4) on filoviruses and EBOV vaccines.

Career 
In 2008, Marzi moved with Feldmann to the Rocky Mountain Laboratories and continued her BSL4 work on vaccine development for highly pathogenic viruses using primarily the vesicular stomatitis virus (VSV) platform. She also studied the pathogenesis of filoviruses and developed small animal models for these pathogens. Recently, she expanded the VSV vaccine platform to other emerging pathogens like Zika virus. In 2013, Marzi was promoted to staff scientist, and in 2017 to associate scientist. Marzi was selected as a tenure-track investigator in the National Institute of Allergy and Infectious Diseases Laboratory of Virology in 2019. She is chief of the immunobiology and molecular virology unit.

Awards and honors 

References 

Year of birth missing (living people)
Place of birth missing (living people)
National Institutes of Health people
21st-century American biologists
21st-century American women scientists
American medical researchers
Women medical researchers
American virologists
Women virologists
Expatriate academics in the United States
21st-century German scientists
German women biologists
German virologists
University of Erlangen-Nuremberg alumni
German emigrants to the United States
Living people
21st-century German women